Sunstorm Interactive was an American video game developer founded in 1995 by Anthony Campiti, which specialized in hunting simulators and first-person shooters. The majority of their titles were small-scale "value titles", priced between $20 and $30 as compared to the typical computer game that was priced at $50 at the time.

Overview
The company enjoyed their original moderate success by developing add-ons for Build engine first-person shooters such as Duke Nukem 3D, Blood, and Redneck Rampage. At this point, the company had approximately 6 full-time employees. Sunstorm finally made an industry name for itself when it developed the first hunting simulation game Deer Hunter in 1997. Deer Hunter opened up an entirely new genre and spawned many sequels as well as copycats.

The company relocated to a new office and increased the staff size significantly. They followed up with many more hunting simulators and attempted to branch back into developing action games with titles such as the side scroller Duke Nukem: Manhattan Project. However, they were not able to achieve the same level of success again and finally shut down in early 2003 citing financial and staffing difficulties as the primary reasons. Michael Root went on to found Gabriel Entertainment.

In 2009, the company was reborn as Sunstorm Games LLC. by Anthony Campiti. Now creating mobile games for the iOS and Android platforms, by 2013 the company had produced over 80 titles in total, averaging one million active users daily.  In April of 2015, the company was acquired by TabTale Ltd. for an undisclosed price.

Games
Hunting
 Bird Hunter: Upland Edition
 Bird Hunter: Waterfowl Edition
 Bird Hunter: Wild Wings Edition
 Bird Hunter 2003: Legendary Hunting
 Buckmasters Deer Hunting
 Buckmasters Top Bow Championship
 Carnivores: Cityscape
 Deep Sea Trophy Fishing
 Deer Hunter
 Deer Hunter's Extended Season
 Deer Hunter II: The Hunt Continues
 Deer Hunter II: Extended Season
 Deer Hunter 3: The Legend Continues
 Deer Hunter 3 Gold
 Deer Hunter 4: World-Class Record Bucks
 Deer Hunter 2003
 Feed'n Chloe
 Fishermans Paradise
 Grand Slam Turkey Hunter
 Hunting Unlimited
 Pro Bass Fishing
 Primal Prey
 Rocky Mountain Trophy Hunter: Interactive Big Game Hunting
 Rocky Mountain Trophy Hunter: Alaskan Expedition
 Rocky Mountain Trophy Hunter 2
 Rocky Mountain Trophy Hunter 3
 Shark! Hunting The Great White Shark
 Sportsman's Paradise
 Sportsman's Paradise 2
 Wild Turkey Hunt

Build Engine add-ons
 Duke Caribbean: Life's A Beach for Duke Nukem 3D
 Duke It Out in D.C. for Duke Nukem 3D
 Duke Xtreme for Duke Nukem 3D
 Cryptic Passage for Blood
 Redneck Rampage: Suckin' Grits On Route 66 for Redneck Rampage
 Wanton Destruction for Shadow Warrior (Not commercially released. Given away for free years after development on September 5, 2005)

Other
 Airport Tycoon 2
 Board Game Classics
 Duke Nukem: Manhattan Project
 Hard Truck: 18 Wheels of Steel
 High Impact Paintball
 Indoor Sports Games
 Land Mine!
 Police Tactical Training
 RC DareDevil
 The Skunny series:
 Skunny: Back to the Forest
 Skunny: In The Wild West
 Skunny Kart
 Skunny: Save Our Pizzas!
 Skunny's Desert Raid
 Skunny: Lost in Space
 Skunny: Special Edition
 W!Zone
 ''911 Fire Rescue

References

Defunct companies based in Indianapolis
Video game companies established in 1995
Video game companies of the United States
Video game development companies